Chorley railway station serves the town of Chorley in Lancashire, England. Since 2004 it has been linked with Chorley Interchange bus and coach station. It is on the Manchester–Preston line.

History of the station

The current railway station is a modern version from the 1980s that was built on top of the original station. The level of the old platforms can be seen under the existing station's two platforms which are connected by underpass. Passenger trains over this route (between Blackburn & Wigan) were however withdrawn in January 1960. Further work was done in 2016 and 2017 in connection with the electrification of the line between Euxton Junction and Manchester.

The level crossing at the south end of the station was removed and the signal box was moved to the Ribble Steam Railway at Preston .

Current station facilities
Platform to platform connection is via a stepped subway. Wheelchair users may exit the station and use the sloped public footpath subway (Chorley FP 32) immediately to the south, this emerges at the foot of the Railway Pub, access is then via an entry off Friday Street.

There are no toilets on the station and the nearest ones are in the bus station across the road. Chorley's rail services provide a link for the commuters of Lancashire to Preston, Manchester and Bolton.

A chargeable railway car park is available to the south of the station with car parking tickets available for purchase from the station ticket office.

Ticket purchase & collection machines are available, two on Platform 2 (Manchester bound), and two in the ticket office. The ticket office is staffed 0625 - 1900 on weekdays, 0625 - 2100 on Saturdays and 0830 - 1900 on Sundays.

It was announced by the Department for Transport in December 2009, the line between Preston and Manchester, on which Chorley is situated, would be electrified which would reduce journey times to Manchester by up to ten minutes. Timetabled electric services began with the May 2019 timetable, training and introductory services had been running from February 2019.

Services
All trains that stop at Chorley station are operated by Northern Trains

Northbound

Southbound
3tph to  via 
1tph fast, calling at  only before Manchester.

From 26 July to 7 September 2008, the service provision to and from the station was limited due to major engineering work taking place to the north; this was to improve drainage in a cutting and remove a long-standing speed restriction.  A rail replacement bus service operated to and from Preston, whilst many trains were diverted via Wigan. This period of disruption was blamed for the decline in passenger usage shown in the figures shown above.

The direct Scottish service had been reduced at the December 2013 timetable change, when most trains were diverted via Wigan to join the newly electrified line over Chat Moss. A small number of peak services still operated via Chorley using Class 185 diesel multiple units thereafter, but these ceased at the December 2014 timetable change.

First TransPennine Express used to run the service from Manchester Airport to Blackpool North, but this was passed on to the new Northern franchise on 1 April 2016.

Saturday and Sunday services were replaced by buses on most weekends from May 2015 until November 2018, due to the late-running electrification work on the route. Weekend services resumed on Sunday 11 November 2018, after the completion of the electrification engineering work.

Renovation and electrification

From June to October 2016, as part of the Manchester-Preston electrification scheme, the station has been renovated and the trackbed lowered slightly to accommodate the overhead wires. The subways roofs were also replaced; both platforms have been rebuilt and extended to accommodate longer trains. During the rebuild, a temporary platform 1 was installed south of the former level crossing with access from the car park and no passenger trains called at weekends; services were again diverted via Wigan.

The badly-delayed electrification work on the route saw further timetable alterations and rail replacement buses at weekends since the May 2018 timetable change.  Some northbound trains now terminate at either Buckshaw Parkway or Preston instead of running through to Blackpool, whilst weekend engineering possessions saw buses replacing trains until November 2018.

The first electric train to run through the station was a Virgin Pendolino, on a test run during the night of 13 December 2018

Electric trains, serving the station, commenced on 11 February 2019 utilising Class 319 electric multiple units.

Notes

External links

Railway stations in Chorley
DfT Category D stations
Former Lancashire and Yorkshire Railway stations
Railway stations in Great Britain opened in 1841
Northern franchise railway stations
Buildings and structures in Chorley
1841 establishments in England